Haris Bandey (born 14 February 1999) is a Pakistani swimmer. He competed in the men's 400 metre freestyle event at the 2016 Summer Olympics. He hails from East Finchley in North London and trains at the Barnet Copthall Swimming Club.

References

External links
 

1999 births
Living people
Pakistani male freestyle swimmers
Olympic swimmers of Pakistan
Swimmers at the 2016 Summer Olympics
Swimmers at the 2014 Summer Youth Olympics
Swimmers at the 2014 Commonwealth Games
Commonwealth Games competitors for Pakistan
People from Islington (district)
Sportspeople from London
21st-century Pakistani people